Aetius decollatus, is a species of spider of the genus Aetius. It is native to India and Sri Lanka. In 2013, this species was discovered in India by a PhD scholar in Bombay for first time in the 117 years after the species was first found in Sri Lanka.

See also 
 List of Corinnidae species

References

Corinnidae
Spiders of Asia
Spiders described in 1896